Sir Guy Carleton Secondary School is a secondary school in Ottawa, Ontario, Canada.  The school specializes in Skilled Trades Education, with three Specialist High Skills Majors (SHSM) programs. It is an application based school serving students living in the west side of the Ottawa Carleton District School Board.  The school also has three OCDSB Specialized Special Education Classes: a General Learning Program, a Physical Support Program and a Behavioural Intervention Program.  Offer of placements in the Special Education Classes is done by central board committee.

The school is located in Nepean on Centrepointe Drive.
Sir Guy is under the jurisdiction of the Ottawa Carleton District School Board.

Sir Guy is also known for their motto The School That Works; it is well-known not for its athletics but is for its classes.

Students and staff
Sir Guy's students come from the western zones of the Ottawa-Carleton District School Board and from other Ottawa area boards. Students are collected by bus from all over the city to participate in courses suited to their level of ability and entry into the workforce.

The staff is composed of more than 50 teachers, 20 educational assistants, office staff, culinary staff, a technician and custodial staff.

Programs offered

Programs Offered
Vocational Program
Advanced Culinary Education (ACE) Specialist High Skills Major
Urban Farming Operations (UFO) Specialist High Skills Major
Advanced Program in Automotive Repair Technology (APART) Specialist High Skills Major
Cooperative Education
Non-Composite High School
Ontario Youth Apprenticeship Program
Behaviour Intervention Program
General Learning Program
Physical Support Program

All meals at Sir Guy are created under the supervision of the Red Seal chefs at the school.  In the morning, free breakfasts are provided to all who want one.  

The SAGE Youth Program gives students an opportunity to develop and improve their basic literacy skills by working one-on-one with trained and devoted volunteers once a week.   The volunteers are from Sage Youth, a volunteer organization based in Ottawa whose purpose is helping high-need children to improve their reading. Sir Guy Carleton hosts these volunteers and pairs them students who want extra help.

Notable events
Sir Guy celebrated its 25th year in 2006.
Retired Principal Debra Ford is among 32 exceptional leaders in education from across the country being recognized as one of Canada's Outstanding Principals for 2007. 
Retired Principal  Kevin Bush was recognized for the same award in 2010-2011.
The school was featured on the TVO Studio 2 program that was produced in June 2005.
Sir Guy Carleton hosts an annual Thanksgiving dinner for the community which serves more than 1,000 meals.

See also
List of high schools in Ontario

References

External links
School Website
OCDSB Website
2006-2007 OCDSB School Profile
2005-2006 OCDSB School Profile
2004-2005 OCDSB School Profile

.

High schools in Ottawa